Tonyee Chow Hang-tung (born 24 January 1985) is a Hong Kong activist, barrister and politician. During the crackdown by authorities on the Hong Kong Alliance in Support of Patriotic Democratic Movements of China, which began in June 2021 and was mainly based on national security charges over the Alliance's annual vigils in remembrance of the 1989 Tiananmen Square protests and massacre, Chow was cast into the limelight, having become the convenor of the group after the arrest of leaders Lee Cheuk-yan and Albert Ho in April. In December 2021 and January 2022, Chow was convicted respectively for inciting and taking part in an unlawful assembly on occasion of the vigil in 2020, and for organizing the vigil in 2021, and sentenced to a total of 22 months in prison. A trial date for further national security charges against Chow has not been set . By that time, observers considered her to be possibly the most prominent remaining dissident voice in Hong Kong.

Early life and education 
Chow was born and grew up in Hong Kong. She studied geophysics at University of Cambridge. Chow realised that human rights issues were her real interest, so she gave up doctoral studies and returned to Hong Kong in 2010, where she studied law at the University of Hong Kong after having spent some time working at an NGO.

A barrister with Harcourt Chambers, she was called to the Bar in Hong Kong in 2016.

Political activism and arrests 
Chow serves as vice chairwoman of the Hong Kong Alliance, which organised annual marches and vigils to commemorate the 1989 Tiananmen Square protests. On 4 June 2021, Chow was arrested for promoting an unauthorised assembly on the 32nd anniversary of the protests. She was thrust into the limelight in 2021 because both Lee Cheuk-yan and Albert Ho from the Alliance were in prison, with Chow having become the new convenor. Prior to her arrest, she had urged Hongkongers to "turn on the lights wherever you are – whether on your phone, candles or electronic candles". The Scotsman considered her arrest as an example of the Chinese government's "crushing of dissent in Hong Kong". Chow was released on bail on 5 June, but was arrested again on 30 June. On 2 July she appeared in court, which adjourned her case to 30 July whilst refusing to grant her bail. After further bail denials on 9 and 23 July, she was granted bail on 5 August on the condition of posting a cash bail and a surety of HK$50,000 ($6,400), handing over all travel documents, and submitting a declaration that she does not hold a BNO passport. Her case was scheduled for 5 October.

Chow was arrested again on 8 September, after the Alliance had rejected a demand by police to surrender information regarding allegations that the Alliance was an "agent of foreign forces". Three other members of the Alliance were arrested at the same time, and a fourth one the following day. Also on 9 September, police froze  worth of assets of the Alliance, and charged Chow, alongside Ho, Lee and the Alliance itself with "incitement to subversion", a crime under the national security law, over the banned 2020 vigil. On 10 September, the court rejected the bail application of Chow over the latter charge. On 13 December, she was sentenced to 12 months in prison over the banned 2020 vigil. On 4 January 2022, she was jailed for another 15 months over the banned 2021 vigil; the judge ordered 10 months of the sentence to be served consecutively with the December sentence, meaning that Chow was to spend a total of 22 months in jail. The judge did not accept the reasoning of Chow, who defended herself, that she had wanted to "incite others not to forget June 4", not encourage a gathering, which the judge dismissed as "simply unbelievable". During the mitigation hearing the same day, Chow, who had pleaded not guilty, was reading from the memoirs of families of people killed at Tiananmen until admonished by the judge, who said that the court would not allow Chow to make a political statement. 

On 14 December 2022, Chow won an appeal against her 15-month sentence over the banned 2021 vigil. The presiding judge said in a written statement that police "did not raise measures or conditions to be considered" in order to let the vigil take place during the pandemic.

International reactions 
The United Nations Human Rights Council released a statement on 12 October 2021 which said that four of its human rights experts (Fionnuala Ní Aoláin, Clément Nyaletsossi Voule, Irene Khan and Mary Lawlor) had submitted a detailed analysis to the Chinese central government regarding the national security law. In its criticism of the law, which it described, in the wording of the statement, as exhibiting "fundamental incompatibility with international law and with China's human rights obligations", it specifically expressed deep concern about the arrest of Chow and about her right to a free trial in view of her having been denied bail twice.

References

External links 

 

Alumni of the University of Hong Kong
Hong Kong politicians
Barristers of Hong Kong
Hong Kong democracy activists
Hong Kong political prisoners
Living people
1985 births